Guy Sebastian is an Australian pop, R&B and soul singer-songwriter who was the first winner of the Australian Idol series in 2003. Since then he has released ten top ten albums, with seven reaching the top five, including three which peaked at number one. He has also released 23 top 20 singles, with 14 reaching the top ten of the ARIA Singles Chart including six number ones. This is a list of the nominations, awards, and other recognition Sebastian has received during his career.

Awards & nominations

ARIA Music Awards
The Australian Recording Industry Association Music Awards, commonly known as ARIA Music Awards are held to recognise excellence and innovation and achievement across all genres of Australian music. Award nominees and winners, excluding for sales and public voted categories, are selected by the ARIA Academy comprising "judges from all sectors of the music industry - retail, radio and tv, journalists and critics, television presenters, concert promoters, agents, ARIA member record companies and past ARIA winners". The inaugural ARIA Awards took place in 1987.

ARIA No. 1 Chart Awards
The Australian Recording Industry Association (ARIA) held the No. 1 Chart Awards to recognise Australian artists who achieved number one on the ARIA singles or album charts. The Awards were last held in 2012.

Note a ^Since 2012 Sebastian has achieved number one's with "Battle Scars" featuring Lupe Fiasco, and for the albums Armageddon and T.R.U.T.H.. Sebastian is the only Australian male artist in Australian music history to achieve six number one singles, and is third overall for all Australian acts. Only Kylie Minogue and Delta Goodrem have more.

ARIA End of Year and End of Decade Charts
ARIA recognises sales achievements with the listing of the highest selling releases of each year on their website in the End of Year Charts. In 2010 they also listed the highest selling releases of the decade 2000 - 2009 in the End of Decade Charts. Sebastian's debut single "Angels Brought Me Here" was named the highest selling single of the decade and he was presented with an award for this at the 2010 ARIA No. 1 Awards.

APRA Awards
The APRA Awards are run in Australia and New Zealand by the Australasian Performing Right Association to recognise songwriting skills, sales and airplay performance by its members. Nominations and winners in each category are chosen either by the voting members of APRA, members of the APRA Board or APRA based statistical analysis. The Song of the Year category is fully peer judged with the shortlist, final five nominees and winner voted for by the songwriting members of APRA.

International Songwriting Competition
The International Songwriting Competition (ISC) is an annual song contest for both aspiring and established songwriters. The judging panel is made up of musicians, songwriters and industry experts, and songs are judged on creativity, originality, lyrics, melody, arrangement and overall likeability.

Australian Commercial Radio Awards
The Australian Commercial Radio Awards are held annually. Winners are decided by a judging panel from nominations by radio stations and individuals.

Australian Club Entertainment Awards
The Australian Club Entertainment Awards are held annually to honour Australian music and variety acts. Nominees are selected by a committee, with the winners decided by member vote.

Australian and New Zealand Urban Music Awards
The Australian and New Zealand Urban Music Awards were held in 2006 and 2007. Nominees were selected by a panel of music industry figures, with the winners decided by public vote.

Channel [V] Oz Artist of the Year
The Channel V Oz Artist of the Year Award is awarded annually. Channel V choose the original nominees, with public vote deciding the final ten, final four and overall winner.

Country Music Awards (CMAA) 
The Country Music Awards of Australia (CMAA) (also known as the Golden Guitar Awards) is an annual awards night held in January during the Tamworth Country Music Festival, celebrating recording excellence in the Australian country music industry. They have been held annually since 1973.

|-
|rowspan="2"| 2016 ||rowspan="2"| "Spirit of the Anzacs"   (with Lee Kernaghan, Sheppard, Jessica Mauboy, Jon Stevens, Shannon Noll and Megan Washington)  || Vocal Collaboration of the Year || 
|-
| Video clip of the Year || 
|-

National Live Music Awards
The National Live Music Awards (NLMAs) are a broad recognition of Australia's diverse live industry, celebrating the success of the Australian live scene. The awards commenced in 2016.

|-
| National Live Music Awards of 2020
| himself
| Musicians Making a Difference
| 
|-

Nickelodeon Kids' Choice Awards
The Australian Nickelodeon Kids' Choice Awards is an annual awards show for Australian and overseas entertainers. Nominees and winners are decided by public vote. In 2012 the Australian Awards were not held. Since 2013 Australian categories have been added to the US Kids' Choice Awards.

MTV Europe Music Awards

Australian MTV Awards
The Australian MTV Awards, formally known as the MTV Australia Video Music Awards were presented by MTV between 2005 and 2009. Nominees were chosen by MTV, with public vote deciding the winners.

Australian GQ Awards
The Australian GQ Awards are held annually. The nominees for Man of the Year are selected by GQ magazine, with the public deciding the winner. The winners of all other categories are chosen by the magazine.

Advertiser Confidential/Scene Awards
The Advertiser is Adelaide's daily newspaper. Most years they hold the Scene Awards, formally known as the Confidential Awards. The public decide the winners from pools of nominees selected by the newspaper.

Dolly Teen Choice Awards
The Dolly Teen Choice Awards are presented by Dolly Magazine. The nominees are chosen by the magazine, and the winner is selected by public vote.

POPrepublic.tv IT List Awards
POPreplublic.tv is an Australian online entertainment and lifestyle magazine. Nominees for their IT List Awards are selected by the magazine, and winners are decided by public vote.

World Music Awards
The World Music Awards honours the best-selling recording artists from every continent. They are presented on sales merit and voted by the public. The International Federation of the Phonographic Industry (IFPI) provides the organization with the names of the best-selling artists from all major territories.

Other awards and recognition

References

Sebastian, Guy